Alexander Rawlins is an English singer-songwriter, multi-instrumentalist and record producer. He is the lead vocalist and one half of the Indie Electronic duo LAIKIPIA, who in March 2017 released their first single "Hello Dreamer". His career started while he was a British army officer serving in Afghanistan. He was a 2014 BBC Introducing Artist and is well known for his songs "We See You" and "1000 Miles Apart".

Career
Xander Rawlins, also known as Alex Rawlins (full first name Alexander), attended Bedford School, Bedford, England and Oxford Brookes University. After graduation from University, he attended The Royal Military Academy Sandhurst commissioning into the Grenadier Guards in 2007. In 2009, he deployed to Afghanistan as an Infantry platoon commander with 30 men under his command.

BBC Three television broadcast a documentary series entitled Our War: 10 years in Afghanistan. The second episode of the three-episode series contained coverage of Captain Alex Rawlins filming and interviewing his men from 1st Battalion, the Grenadier Guards about their experiences, and captures events surrounding the loss of Guardsman Jamie Janes, a soldier from his platoon, who had died on 5 October 2009 stepping on an IED. Janes' death became a turning point in the British public's awareness of the human cost of Improvised explosive devices (IEDs). The documentary Our War won "Best Documentary Series" and "Best Multichannel Programme" at the Broadcast Awards 2012, and a BAFTA for "Best Factual Series".

Rawlins began writing and recording music as a teenager. He co-created music with lifelong friend and fellow Devon inhabitant, Sam Phillips, under the name "The RawLips". In 2005, whilst at University in Oxford, Rawlins formed the band "Pulling Claudia" (later changed to "The Rawlins") with Phillips on lead, brother Digby on keys, Henry Latham on drums and Ben Dimond on bass. In 2009, Rawlins, while still in Afghanistan started singing in his platoon made band "The Renegade Irritations", also nicknamed "The Helmand Philharmonic" as lead vocalist and guitarist to entertain the soldiers. He played songs on his guitar, ukulele and a cornet to a "captured audience" of soldiers. "Helmand Philharmonic" was reference to Helmand Province in Afghanistan, where he was serving. Although he sang some cover versions of known songs requested, he would include in his repertoire original self-authored songs like "The City", "Oh Staff Sergeant", "1000 Miles Apart" and others he would pen during free hours during military service.

He has played all over Europe and the US and is currently based in Los Angeles preparing for the release of a new EP.

"1000 Miles Apart"

Rawlins started writing "1000 Miles Apart" in England and finished it while on the front in Helmand Province, Afghanistan, in Christmas 2009. A tribute to Jamie Janes, it was about a soldier being far away in the battlefield and longing to be home for Christmas. The recording with extra footage from the battalion soldiers themselves was meant to be sent by them to their families and friends. British Forces Broadcasting Service radio and television, the British Forces News and mainstream news networks and newspapers promoted the release of 1000 Miles Apart as a contender to the aspired No. 1 on Christmas. All proceeds were pledged to Army Benevolent Fund The Soldiers' Charity (ABF) and to the Combat Stress charity for serving men and women suffering from posttraumatic stress disorder (PTSD) and other mental health issues.

After release
Rawlins was stationed back in his home country and performed public duties at Windsor Castle, Buckingham Palace and The Tower of London.

He has now left the Army. He established in Los Angeles to release new materials. He was a featured BBC Introducing artist in 2014 and is currently in Los Angeles preparing for the release of a new EP.

Soldier in Blue
In 2012, Rawlins co-founded Soldier in Blue, a consultancy firm specialising in providing serving and ex-service personnel and their dependents to the entertainment industry as extras and advisors. They have worked on such productions as the musical Les Miserables, the programme Monuments Men, the BBC documentary Our World War, the films Fury, Testament of Youth, Suffragette and the Star Wars saga.

LAIKIPIA

In 2017, he co-founded the trans-Atlantic Indie electronic duo LAIKIPIA and the record company LAIKIPIA Music with the American classically trained musician and electronic music producer Taylor Harrison. Xander was the lead vocalist and producer of the duo formation developing a distinct sound, combining a blend of harmony driven storytelling, dance floor beats, and melody rich instrumentals. The singles released included the debut "Hello Dreamer", followed by "Down Down' that featured Thurz, "Living Outside" and "I Know Love". Further releases include "That Feeling" in 2019 and "Big Fish" in 2020.

Discography

Albums
2020: 10 Years

EPs
2010: 1000 Miles Apart EP

Singles
Xander Rawlins
2010: "1000 Miles Apart" – Xander Rawlins
2011: "The City" – Xander Rawlins
2013: "We See You" – Xander Rawlins

LAIKIPIA
2017: "Hello Dreamer" – LAIKIPIA
2017: "Down Down" (feat Thurz) – LAIKIPIA
2017: "Living Outside" – LAIKIPIA
2017: "I Know Love" – LAIKIPIA
2019: "That Feeling" – LAIKIPIA
2020: "Big Fish"

References

External links
Xander Rawlins Facebook

Grenadier Guards officers
British male singers
Living people
British Army personnel of the War in Afghanistan (2001–2021)
People educated at Bedford School
Year of birth missing (living people)